SS Minnekahda was a transatlantic ocean liner that was launched in Ireland in 1917 and scrapped in Scotland in 1936. She was laid down in 1914 but the First World War delayed her completion. Because of the war she was completed in 1918 as a troop ship, and then worked as a cargo ship.

Minnekahda was not fitted out as a civilian passenger liner until 1921. She was refitted in 1926 to carry fewer passengers in more comfort. From 1931 she was laid up in New Jersey.

Minnekahda was in the fleet of the Atlantic Transport Line, which was part of the International Mercantile Marine Company. She was registered in the United Kingdom until 1920, and then in the United States.

Building
Harland & Wolff built Minnekahda in Belfast on slipway number 6 as yard number 446. She was laid down in 1914, but work on her was suspended after the First World War broke out that August. As the Central Powers' U-boat campaign depleted Allied shipping, the need for replacement ships increased, and Harland & Wolff resumed work on Minnekahda. She was launched on 8 March 1917 and completed as a troop ship on 21 March 1918.

Her holds could carry 16,000 tons of cargo, including  of refrigerated space.

Minnekahda was one of a series of Harland & Wolff steamships that were propelled by a combination of reciprocating steam engines and a steam turbine. She had three screws. A pair of four-cylinder triple expansion engines drove her port and starboard screws. Exhaust steam from those engines powered one low-pressure turbine that drove her middle screw.

Atlantic Transport Line registered Minnekahda at Belfast. Her UK official number was 136369 and her code letters were JSLH.

British troop and cargo ship

Minnekahda repatriated Allied troops after the Armistice of 11 November 1918. On 23 November she left Liverpool taking home 3,010 members of the American Expeditionary Forces. She sailed in convoy with two other British troop ships,  and Orca, and an escort of destroyers. On the voyage one US soldier aboard Minnekahda died of pneumonia, which he caught as a secondary infection after catching Spanish flu. Atlantic storms slowed the convoy by 36 hours, and Lapland and Minnekahda reached New York on 5 December.

In February 1919 Minnekahda repatriated 12 companies of the 329th Infantry Regiment. On 16 January 1920 she left London on her final trooping voyage, crossing the Atlantic via Halifax, Nova Scotia to New York.

On 27 March 1920 Minnekahda started service between London and New York as a cargo ship. Her cargo included 17 tons of gold bullion, worth $9,800,000, in her specie room. The bullion was from HM Treasury, as an instalment repayment of war loans. When she docked in New York on 7 April, motor trucks under armed guard met her to take the bullion to the Federal Reserve Bank of New York.

American Line chartered Minnekadha for a single round trip from New York to London, Hamburg and back to New York that began on 17 July 1920. She began her last voyage as a cargo ship on 8 October that year, leaving London for New York.

Immigrant liner
On 3 November 1920 Atlantic Transport Line changed Minnekahdas port of registration to New York. Her US official number was 220814 and her code letters were MBVP.

Bethlehem Steel at Fore River Shipyard in Quincy, Massachusetts refitted the ship at a cost of $700,000 to carry civilian passengers. She was a one-class ship, with cabins of two, four or six berths. Public rooms included a lounge and a smoking room. The New York Times reported her total capacity as 2,500 passengers, but other sources give the total as 2,150.

Minnekahdas first voyage as a passenger liner was another charter to American Line for a single round trip. She left New York on 31 March 1921, called at Naples and Hamburg, and returned to New York. On 21 May that year she entered regular Atlantic Transport Line service between New York and Hamburg.

When Minnekahda docked in New York on 26 July 1922, a squad of 30 US Customs personnel searched her and inspected her disembarking passengers and crew. Her Quartermaster was found in possession of undeclared diamonds and other jewelry worth a total of $10,000, and was arrested on suspicion of smuggling.

Many of Minnekahdas westbound passengers were migrants from Europe to the USA. In one sailing from Hamburg via Southampton to New York in October 1923 she carried 827 passengers, most of whom were German migrants.

On 30 November 1924 Minnekahda ran aground off the German coast near Hamburg. 2,500 tons of her cargo was unloaded onto lighters, and by 3 December she had been refloated. Tugs assisted her to reach Hamburg. Her final voyage from Hamburg began on 10 January 1925.

Tourist liner
In 1921 the US Congress had adopted the Emergency Quota Act, which set quotas to limit immigration to the US from each country. In April 1924 it passed the Immigration Act of 1924, which significantly reduced those quotas. In March 1925 Atlantic Transport Line announced that it would reduce Minnekahdas passenger accommodation to 750 berths, all tourist class. The company changed her European port of departure from Hamburg to London, and announced that she would now bring British tourists to the US. Her new route included a call at Boulogne. The return fare was £38 per passenger. Her first voyage on her new route started on 24 March 1925. In the 1925 tourist season she made ten round trips and carried 6,228 tourists.

On 4 and 5 December 1925 on a westbound voyage from London to New York, Minnekahda encountered a "hurricane-force" storm that tore away  of railing from the after part of her deck. On 8 December she docked in New York, and US Customs officers immediately came aboard and searched her. Her officers complained at the roughness of the search, turning passengers' luggage "topsy-turvy". The Ship's Clerk said that Customs officers entered his cabin in his absence, threw his two suitcases on the floor and broke the locks.

Although announced in March 1925, Minnekahdas refit to 750 tourist berths was undertaken in the winter of 1925–26, in Boulogne. A new boat deck was added to increase her promenade space, and her cabins and bathrooms were improved.

On 25 September 1927 Minnekahda struck a submerged shipwreck a few miles outside Boulogne. The collision tore off part of her bilge keel, damaged six hull plates on her starboard side and broke one of the blades of her starboard propeller. Admiralty charts showed no known wreck at that position. Trinity House sent a tender to mark the wreck with a buoy until it could  be made safe.

Minnekahda had been scheduled to embark passengers in London, and to leave on 1 October for New York. Minnekahda resumed passenger service with a departure from London on 29 October.

In 1929 Minnekahda began the tourist season by leaving New York on 6 April, bound for London via Boulogne. She carried only 240 passengers, but that was 75 more than she carried on a similar sailing in April 1928. From this the IMM predicted a successful season in the North Atlantic trade.

In August 1929 the IMM reported that its business was thriving, thanks to the increasing popularity of tourist class travel. It announced that several ships had carried record numbers of passengers, including Minnekahda which carried 809 on a single sailing that departed on 29 June. IMM also stated that she carried a total of 1,932 passengers spread over three sailings, and this was a record for the IMM fleet.

In a storm on a westbound voyage on 31 January 1930 a huge wave hit Minnekahda. It tore off part of the deck railing from her starboard side, damaged some of her davits and carried away several of her ventilators. Several inches of water flooded her smoking room. Much of the rest of her voyage was also stormy. The ship reduced speed and reached New York on 5 February, two days late.

By mid-1930 Minnekahda was equipped with wireless direction finding. On a westbound voyage on 19 July 1930 a young woman passenger jumped overboard. The ship stopped her starboard engine, turned around, and launched two lifeboats. One of the boats, commanded by her Third Officer, rescued the young woman and took her back aboard, where she was admitted to the ship's hospital.

On 12 August 1931 Minnekahda took part in the successful test of a radio facsimile system. General Electric transmitted a copy of the Union-Star newspaper of Schenectady by wireless to Minnekahda and the United States Lines ship . Charles J. Young, son of the RCA founder Owen D. Young, and Dr Ernst Alexanderson, invented the system.

Fate
On 12 October 1931 Minnekahda docked in New York, ending her final voyage from London. She was laid up first at Pier 52, and then moved to Staten Island for the winter. Throughout her ten-year passenger career she had the same Master, Captain Johan Jensen, who was born in Denmark and became a US citizen.

By 1934 a new four-letter call sign KDKK replaced Minnekahdas code letters and earlier three-letter call sign.

By 1936 Minnekahda was laid up at Hoboken, New Jersey. That February she was sold for scrap. At first it was reported that Turner & Hickman of Glasgow had bought her for $125,000, but in mid-March it was reported that her buyers were WH Arnott, Young and Co. On 14 March she moved to the Morse Dry Dock in Brooklyn to be prepared for her voyage after four and a half years laid up.

Minnekahda was re-registered under the UK flag and embarked a UK crew. On 14 April she left New York for Scotland carrying a cargo of scrap iron. On 29 April she reached Arnott, Young's yard Dalmuir on the River Clyde to be scrapped.

References

Bibliography

External links
  – Christmas Day dinner menu

1917 ships
Maritime incidents in 1924
Maritime incidents in 1927
Merchant ships of the United Kingdom
Ocean liners
Passenger ships of the United States
Ships built by Harland and Wolff
Steamships of the United Kingdom
Steamships of the United States
Troop ships of the United Kingdom
World War I passenger ships of the United Kingdom